John Brown (1887–?) of  Grimsby, Lincolnshire, was an English contract bridge player and writer. He was the winner of the National Pairs, Northern Area in 1952. His best-known book is Winning Defence (1952) which has been regarded as making a "major contribution to the technical development of the game". He was a contributor to many periodicals.

Brown was the head ("County Captain") of the Lincolnshire Contract Bridge Association for several years starting in 1947.

Publications
  300 pages. Various reprints to 1955.
  343 pages. Various reprints to 1960.
  133 pages.
  172 pages.

Notes

References

External links 

  (?) 

1887 births
Contract bridge writers
English contract bridge players
Year of death missing
Date of birth missing
Place of birth missing
Place of death missing